Darwinulidae is a family of ostracods belonging to the order Podocopida.

Genera:
 Alicenula Rossetti & Martens, 1998
 Darwella
 Darwinula Brady & Norman, 1889
 Isabenula Rossetti, Pinto & Martens, 2011
 Microdarwinula Danielopol, 1969
 Penthesilenula Rossetti & Martens, 1998
 Vestalenula Rossetti & Martens, 1998

References

Ostracods